Prelude to Fame is a 1950 British drama film set in Italy, directed by Fergus McDonell and starring Guy Rolfe, Kathleen Byron and Kathleen Ryan. It is based on the 1924 story "Young Archimides" by Aldous Huxley, about a mathematical prodigy who is also gifted in music.

Plot
While vacationing in Italy, Nick Morell, son of John Morell, a famous English philosopher and amateur musician and his wife Catherine, becomes friendly with young Guido. Morell discovers the boy has an extraordinary instinct for orchestration and a phenomenal music memory. A neighboring couple, Signor and Signora Boudini become aware of the boy's talents, and the Signora appeals to Guido's parents to let her educate him musically. Torn by their love for their son and the duty they feel to let the world hear his talent, they consent.

Guido is tutored by Dr. Lorenzo. Signora Bondini denies the boy all contact with his parents and everyone else except her. She also has neither sent his letters to his family, nor let him see the ones they've sent to him. He becomes phenomenally successful and makes the grand tour of Europe, while Signora Bondini is enraptured by the acclaim given her through her "discovery" of the boy. She prepares to take him to America and also prepares adoption papers.

Cast
 Guy Rolfe as John Morell  
 Kathleen Byron as Signora Anne Bondini  
 Kathleen Ryan as Catherine Morell  
 Jeremy Spenser as Guido Ferugia  
 Henry Oscar as Signor Mario Bondini  
 Rosalie Crutchley as Carlotta Ferugia  
 John Slater as Dr. Lorenzo  
 James Robertson Justice as Sir Arthur Harold  
 Ferdy Mayne as Carlo Ferugia  
 Robert Rietty as Giuseppe  
 Robin Dowell as Nick Morell  
 Hugo Schuster as Dr. Freihaus  
 Michael Balfour as Lucio  
 Christopher Lee as Newsman  
 David McCallum Sr. as Leader of orchestra, Royal Albert Hall  
 Dora Hyde as Leader of orchestra, Naples  
 Michael Croudson as Nick's Friend  
 Don Liddel as Benjamino  
 Ben Williams as Car Driver  
 Alex Fields as Doorkeeper 
 Penny Dane as Maid  
 Leonard Trolley as Waiter

Production
It was made at Pinewood Studios with sets designed by the art director Frederick Pusey. This was the last film produced in the Rank Organisation's "Independent Frame" production system, an attempt to innovate filmmaking. When 12 years old Jeremy Spenser was given the part, he spent many weeks before filming began being taught how to conduct an orchestra by Marcus Dods, who was, at that time, assistant to film composer / conductor Muir Mathieson, with the result that Jeremy's conducting scenes looked convincing.

References

External links

1950 films
Films based on works by Aldous Huxley
Films shot at Pinewood Studios
Films based on short fiction
Films set in London
Films set in Italy
Films set in Naples
1950s musical drama films
British musical drama films
1950 drama films
British black-and-white films
1950s English-language films
1950s British films